Bollington is a civil parish in Cheshire East, England.  It contains 66 listed buildings that are recorded in the National Heritage List for England, all of which are at Grade II.  This grade is the lowest of the three gradings given to listed buildings and is applied to "buildings of national importance and special interest".  In the parish is the town of Bollington, which is surrounded by countryside leading up to the foothills of the Pennines on the east.  To the south of the town is the long Kerridge Hill, which has been a source of industry, with coal mining on its east side and quarrying on the west side.  These quarries are the source of Kerridge stone-slate, which is used to roof many of the houses in the locality.

The parish was rural before the arrival of industry, and the oldest listed buildings are houses or cottages, and farms with related structures, which date back as far as the 16th century.  There is one surviving listed structure related to coal mining, a chimney.  In the 18th and 19th centuries, the major industry in the town was cotton spinning, and in 1830 the Macclesfield Canal was built, passing through the town on a large embankment.  There are nine listed structures relating to the canal, namely three bridges, three milestones, a distance stone, two aqueducts, and a dock complex.  The mills are no longer processing cotton, but three surviving mills that have been converted into other uses are listed: Clarence Mill, Adelphi Mill and Lowerhouse Mill. The mills brought wealth to their owners, and this is reflected in their building large houses with associated structures, some of which are listed.  The other listed buildings are the sort of buildings to be found in any town, such as public houses and churches.

See also

Listed buildings in Adlington
Listed buildings in Pott Shrigley
Listed buildings in Rainow
Listed buildings in Higher Hurdsfield
Listed buildings in Macclesfield
Listed buildings in Prestbury

References
Citations

Sources

Listed buildings in Bollington
Listed buildings in the Borough of Cheshire East
Lists of listed buildings in Cheshire